Rory Carville (Castleblayney, County Monaghan) is an Irish Michelin star winning head chef formerly with restaurant Locks Brasserie in Dublin.

Carville studied at the Killybegs Catering College.  He has previously worked at the Four Seasons Hotel Dublin under chef Terry White and L'Ecrivain under chef Derry Clarke. Afterwards, he worked with Sébastien Masi at his Pearl Brasserie, before he was appointed as head chef of Locks Brasserie. He left the restaurant in July 2013 to open a new restaurant in the Clarence Hotel, together with Oliver Dunne.

Awards
 2012: Michelin star

References

Living people
Irish chefs
Year of birth missing (living people)
Head chefs of Michelin starred restaurants